Jetion Holdings Limited (AIM: JHL) is a designer, manufacturer and supplier of solar cells and modules. The holdings holds the factory Jiangyin Jetion Science and Technology Co Ltd which is located at Jiangyin (a county-level city of Wuxi), Jiangsu, China. During the year ended 2007, the company had a cell manufacturing capacity of 50 megawatts, and a module capacity of 40 megawatts. The company's output of solar cells for 2007 was 35.2 megawatts. In October 2007, it established a European joint venture, Jetion Europe. In March 2008, Jetion announced that it had entered into an agreement with a Japanese company to purchase 100 megawatts of solar polycrystalline silicon feedstock with immediate effect through until 2011.

Finance
For the six months ended 30 June 2008, Jetion Holdings Limited's revenues totaled $100.7M, up from $38.6M. Net income totaled $9.7M, up from $2.8M. Revenues reflect an increase in income from cells and modules segment. Net income reflects the presence of other income, lower research & development expenses, increased finance income and the presence of share of profits less losses of joint controlled entity.

External links

Jetion website

Companies based in Wuxi
Jiangyin
Photovoltaics manufacturers
Technology companies of China
Manufacturing companies of China
Solar power in China
Chinese brands